Erin Gleason (born September 18, 1977) is an American short track speed skater. She competed in three events at the 1998 Winter Olympics. Raised in Jackson Township, New Jersey, Gleason graduated from Jackson Memorial High School.

References

External links
 

1977 births
Living people
American female short track speed skaters
Jackson Memorial High School alumni
Olympic short track speed skaters of the United States
People from Jackson Township, New Jersey
Short track speed skaters at the 1998 Winter Olympics
Sportspeople from Toms River, New Jersey
21st-century American women